Siti Zaharah binti Sulaiman (Jawi: سيتي زهرة بنت سليمان; born 24 April 1949) is a Malaysian politician. She also was the Minister of National Unity and Community Development, Malaysia. She was Chief of the Women's wing of the United Malays National Organisation (UMNO) from 1996 to 1999. Siti Zaharah is a former member of the parliamentary constituency of Paya Besar, in Pahang for four terms from 1995 to 2008. In 2008 general election, she was replaced by Abdul Manan Ismail from BN-UMNO.

Career
During her tenure as Deputy Minister of Health, she officiated the launch of the No Tobacco Month 1998 at Pasar Budaya, Kuala Lumpur on 31 May 1998. Since 1989, 31 May was proclaimed by the World Health Organization (WHO) as World No Tobacco Day.

UMNO Women's Politics
Siti Zaharah was elected to the UMNO Supreme Council of the 2000–2003 session. The 'veiled' image is shocking 'of UMNO women.

In October 1996, she won the Wanita Umno Chief position defeating Datuk Seri Rafidah Aziz (1984–1996) with a majority of 27 votes. Siti Zaharah's slogan is 'Bringing Changes,' However, she lost to Rafidah Aziz at the UMNO General Assembly 2000. Siti Zaharah became Wanita UMNO chief for 3 years and 7 months. Datuk Seri Shahrizat Abdul Jalil defeated Rafidah in the struggle of the head of the movement at the UMNO General Assembly 2008.

In 2000, a total of 671 female delegates re-elected Rafidah Aziz. Rafidah held the post for 12 years from 1984 to 1996. Rafidah got 341 votes while Siti Zaharah earned 329. Rafidah won with a 12-vote majority excluding one broken vote.

UMNO women managed to create Amanah Saham Wanita (Asnita) and hoped men could set up Amanah Saham Lelaki (Aslaki). With the membership of 2.8 million UMNO members, it is not impossible for 50 percent of Wanita UMNO members to meet the goal of raising RM200 million.

Siti Zaharah maintains Dr. Mahathir Mohamad in the book 'A Doctor in the House: The Memoirs of Tun Dr. Mahathir Mohamad 'regarding allegations against Dato' Seri Anwar Ibrahim.

Elections
In 1995, she won the Paya Besar parliamentary seats. In 1999, she won again by beating Wan Jusoh Wan Kolok (PKR). In 2004, he won with a majority of 12,518 votes. Her victory marks 38 out of 43 BN women candidates win in the election. Also winning was Rafidah Aziz (Kuala Kangsar), Datin Paduka Zaleha Ismail (Gombak); Datuk Shahrizat Abdul Jalil (Lembah Pantai); Seripah Noli Syed Husin (Sepang); Senator Mastika Junaidah Husin (Arau); Rosnah Majid (Tanjong Dawai); Ng Yen Yen (Raub); Chew Mei Fun (Petaling Jaya Utara); Komala Krishnamoorthy (Kapar) and Kamala Ganapathy (Kota Raja); Lim Bee Kau (Padang Serai).

On 27 March 2004, Prime Minister Abdullah Ahmad Badawi dropped Siti Zaharah's name from the post of minister.

Election results

Car accident
In 2005, she was seriously injured in an accident at Jalan Pintasan Sri Jaya. As a result of the accident, she was warded in the Tengku Ampuan Afzan Hospital Intensive Care Unit, receiving a 10.16 cm stitch on the left side of her head while the Paya Besar UMNO divisional women's wing secretary, Fauziah Abdul Rahman, suffered a crack in the neck.

Honours

Honours of Malaysia
  : 
  Commander of the Order of Loyalty to the Crown of Malaysia (PSM) – Tan Sri (2017)
  :
  Knight Companion of the Order of the Crown of Pahang (DIMP) – Dato' (1987)
  Knight Companion of the Order of Sultan Ahmad Shah of Pahang (DSAP) – Dato' (1995)
  Grand Knight of the Order of the Crown of Pahang (SIMP) –  formerly Dato', now Dato' Indera (2001)
  Grand Knight of the Order of Sultan Ahmad Shah of Pahang (SSAP) – Dato' Sri (2003)

References

1949 births
Living people
People from Pahang
Members of the Dewan Rakyat
United Malays National Organisation politicians
Government ministers of Malaysia
Women government ministers of Malaysia
Commanders of the Order of Loyalty to the Crown of Malaysia